Mission Over Korea is a 1953 American war film released by Columbia Pictures, directed by Fred F. Sears, from a story by former war correspondent Richard Tregaskis, author of Guadalcanal Diary. The film stars John Hodiak, John Derek, Audrey Totter and Maureen O'Sullivan.

The Korean War provides the background, including combat footage photographed by producer Robert Cohn and a camera crew near the front lines. The prologue before the onscreen credits notes the film is "Dedicated to the Eighth United States Army, Fifth United States Air Force, Republic of Korea Army who made this film possible. To the men at Itazuki, Kwanju, Taego, Ouijanbu, Pusan, Inchon, Seoul where this story was photographed."

Plot
In June 1950, while stationed at Kimpo, South Korea, Captain George Slocum (John Hodiak) finds out from his friend, Lieutenant Jerry Barker (Todd Karns), that he has to go to Japan. At the airport, he meets Barker's younger brother, Pete (John Derek), who takes up a Stinson L-5 Sentinel liaison aircraft and begins showing off. George reprimands him for careless flying, but sticks up for him when the military police want to arrest Pete.

Pete later meets Kate (Audrey Totter), an Army nurse, while George's wife Nancy (Maureen O'Sullivan), is surprised by his sudden appearance. Both pilots receive news of North Korea's attack on South Korea and are ordered to Pusan, but are diverted to Seoul. En route, they land at bombed-out Kimpo to find a critically wounded Jerry, who dies when the two aircraft are attacked on the way to safety. Pete is devastated and vows to get back at the enemy.

On another mission, in unarmed L-5s again, Pete and George are flying the U.S. ambassador and the Korean president to safety, but are ambushed by enemy aircraft. George manages to skillfully fly low and force his pursuer into a hillside. Pete wants to take a more active role, rigging up a bazooka under his wings, but when he attacks a group of tanks, despite having some success, he is shot down.

George reports the loss and attempts to convince Major Hacker (Rex Reason) to mount a rescue mission, but is turned down, as the base is now cut off and under constant attack. However, Pete makes it back to the base, with the help of a group of South Korean Army soldiers. Both pilots continue to fly desperately needed supplies, but George is badly wounded in an attack on the base. Pete flies him out to a Mobile Army Surgical Hospital unit where he meets Kate again; she has to tell Pete that George succumbed to his wounds.

Pete comes back to the front, more determined than ever to take the fight to the enemy. When Private Swenson (Richard Erdman) and Sergeant Maxie Steiner (Harvey Lembeck) install a powerful radio in his L5, it allows Pete to signal fighter jets overhead that North Korean tanks are about to attack. The fighters destroy the enemy tanks, but the L-5 is shot up. A wounded Pete and Maxie make it back to the base, but crash on landing, barely making it out alive.

Cast
As credited, with screen roles identified:

 John Hodiak as Captain George P. Slocum
 John Derek as Lieutenant Pete Barker
 Audrey Totter as Kate, nurse-lieutenant
 Maureen O'Sullivan as Nancy Slocum
 Harvey Lembeck as Sergeant Maxie Steiner 
 Richard Erdman as Private Swenson
 William Chun as Kilamson Lee aka "Clancy", the base "mascot"
 Rex Reason as Major Jim Hacker
 Todd Karns as Lieutenant Jerry Barker 
 Richard Bowers as "Singing soldier"

Notable actors in uncredited roles include Dabbs Greer as a pilot, Chris Alcaide as an air force officer and John Crawford as Tech Sergeant.

Production

Mission Over Korea was a typical Fred F. Sears actioner, combining an array of stock footage with live action. As one of the many features that Sears helmed in a very short period, the film was a "B" feature, although it did star John Hodiak, Maureen O'Sullivan and future star John Derek. With principal photography done over a two-week span, from February 4–18, 1953 in California, the script was adapted to incorporate a portion of the 85,000 feet of location footage photographed by producer Robert Cohn and a camera crew near the Korean front lines.

Most of the production work that remained involved merging the stock combat footage of United States Air Force and United States Army photography, which featured Stinson L-5 Sentinels, North American P-51 Mustang fighters standing in for Yaks and Lockheed F-80 Shooting Star aircraft.

Prior to the making of Mission Over Korea, the song, "Forgive Me," the English version of a popular Japanese song "Gomen-Nasai", was a minor hit record for Richard Bowers who appears as a soldier in the film and sings the song.

Reception
Like most of Sears' work, with its poor production values and stagey plot, Mission Over Korea was not well received. The review in The New York Times, observed that the film being released at the time of the Korean armistice was "(a) belated, bedraggled salute to American Air Force valor during the early stages of the Korean conflict, this low-budget Columbia drama manages to stir up a stale, sophomoric batter of optimism, heroics and philosophical goo."

References

Notes

Citations

Bibliography
 
 Carlson, Mark. Flying on Film: A Century of Aviation in the Movies, 1912–2012. Duncan, Oklahoma: BearManor Media, 2012. .
 Orriss, Bruce. When Hollywood Ruled the Skies: The Aviation Film Classics of World War II. Hawthorne, California: Aero Associates Inc., 1984. .
 Wheeler, Winston Dixon. Lost in the Fifties: Recovering Phantom Hollywood. Carbondale, Illinois: Southern Illinois University Press, 2005.

External links
 
 
 

1953 films
American war films
American aviation films
Columbia Pictures films
Films about shot-down aviators
Films directed by Fred F. Sears
Korean War aviation films
1950s war films
American black-and-white films
Films about the United States Air Force
1950s English-language films
1950s American films